Chacaltianguis is a municipality in Veracruz, Mexico. It is located in the south of the state of Veracruz. It has a surface of 557.69 km2.

The municipality of Chacaltianguis is delimited to the north by Cosamaloapan, to the east and south-east by José Azueta, to the west by Tuxtilla, and to the south-west by Oaxaca.

It produces principally maize and beans. 

In May, the celebration of the Mango festival takes place; this is the main festivity of the town.

The weather in Chacaltianguis is warm all year with rain in summer.

References

External links 

  Municipal Official Site
  Municipal Official Information

Municipalities of Veracruz